Paul McGee may refer to:
Paul McGee (footballer, born 1954)
Paul McGee (footballer, born 1968)

See also
Paul Magee, Irish murderer